Balaram Hazarika (alias Nigona Shikari) was a noted Assamese animal tracker who showed Lady Curzon around Kaziranga and impressed upon her his urgency of wildlife conservation. Concerned about the dwindling numbers of rhinoceros, she asked her husband, Lord Curzon the Viceroy of India to take necessary political action to save the rhinoceros.

During the centenary celebrations of her visit, from 11 to 17 February 2005, Bapiram Hazarika, a mahout, was honoured along with Nicholas Mosley, 3rd Baron Ravensdale, Lord Curzon's grandson, for the contributions his grandfather made toward making Kaziranga a national park. When Bapiram was honoured along with the Lord, it was a proud moment. He and his colleagues are not just guides, but protectors of animals as well.

References 

Kaziranga National Park
People from Assam
Living people
People from Jorhat district
Year of birth missing (living people)